"Oh Sheila" is a 1985 single by Ready for the World. The song reached number one on the Billboard Hot 100, the Hot Black Singles and the Hot Dance Club Play charts. It was the first of two chart toppers for the band on the Billboard R&B chart, preceding their 1986 number-one R&B hit, "Love You Down".

The song is commonly misattributed to Prince, due to similarity to his vocal and musical style, heavy use of the detuned rimshot sound of a drum machine, and the belief that the song's lyrics allude to frequent Prince collaborator Sheila E.

The use of a faux British accent during parts of the song was the preference of singer Melvin Riley Jr., who said "I like that kind of accent, so I thought I'd use that sound."

Track listing
7-inch vinyl version
"Oh Sheila (Single Version)" – 3:36
"I'm the One Who Loves You" – 3:20

12-inch vinyl version
"Oh Sheila (Extended Version)" – 6:48
"Oh Sheila (Dubstramental)" – 4:00
"Oh Sheila (A cappella)" – 3:54

Chart performance

Weekly charts

Year-end charts

Angel City version: Love Me Right (Oh Sheila)

In 1999, Dutch dance duo Angel City covered the song, featuring vocals by British singer Lara McAllen. The song was first released in 1999 and again in 2003. It is the lead single from the band's 2005 debut album, Love Me Right. Angel City's version retains the verses from the original song but changes the chorus.

"Love Me Right (Oh Sheila)" reached number 11 on the UK Singles Chart and number 95 on the U.S. Billboard Hot 100, becoming their first charting single in the latter. The single also charted in Belgium and the Netherlands.

See also
List of Billboard Hot 100 number-one singles of 1985
List of number-one dance singles of 1985 (U.S.)
List of number-one R&B singles of 1985 (U.S.)
List of number-one singles of 1985 (Canada)
List of number-one dance airplay hits of 2004 (U.S.)

References

1985 songs
1985 singles
1999 debut singles
2003 singles
Ready for the World songs
Billboard Hot 100 number-one singles
RPM Top Singles number-one singles
MCA Records singles